The 1999 Asian Junior Athletics Championships was the eighth edition of the international athletics competition for Asian under-20 athletes, organised by the Asian Athletics Association. It took place from 30 September to 3 October in Singapore. A total of 43 events were contested, which were divided equally between male and female athletes aside from the men's 3000 metres steeplechase.

Medal summary

Men

Women

1999 Medal Table

References

Results
Asian Junior Championships 1999. World Junior Athletics History. Retrieved on 2013-10-18.

External links
Asian Athletics official website

Asian Junior Championships
Asian Junior Athletics Championships
International athletics competitions hosted by Singapore
Asian Junior Athletics Championships
1999 in Asian sport
1999 in youth sport